The Daye Formation is a geologic formation in South China, dating from the Induan up to the early Olenekian (early Triassic). It is of interest as it spans the period immediately after the Permian-Triassic extinction event, the most severe mass extinction known in Earth history.

The Daye Formation hosts the Guiyang biota, as of 2023 the earliest known Mesozoic lagerstätte.

References

Geologic formations of China
Early Triassic